The Angola national basketball team Under-18 represents Angola in international basketball matches and is controlled by the Federação Angolana de Basquetebol. At continental level, it competes at the FIBA Africa Under-18 Championship which is eligible for the FIBA Under-19 World Championship. Angola has been a member of FIBA since 1979.

Roster

Head coach position
  Manuel Silva Gi

World Cup record

Africa Championship record

Manager history
 Raúl Duarte 2017
 Manuel Silva Gi 2016
 Carlos Dinis 2014
 Elvino Dias 2012
 Carlos Dinis 2008
 J.C. Guimarães 2004
 M. Sousa Necas 2000, 2002, 2006
 Wlademiro Romero 1988

Players

2012–2017
A = African championship; = African championship winner;W = World cup

2002–2010
A = African championship;W = World cup

1991–2000
A = African championship;W = World cup

1980–1990
A = African championship; = African championship winner;W = World cup

See also
 Angola national basketball team
 Angola national basketball team Under-16
 Angolan Basketball Federation

References

External links
 2009 Team Roster at FIBA.com
 2008 Team Roster at FIBA.com
 2006 Team Roster at FIBA.com
 2003 Team Roster at FIBA.com
 1995 Team Roster at FIBA.com
 1991 Team Roster at FIBA.com

Men's national under-18 basketball teams
Men's national under-19 basketball teams
under